Petrodessus is a genus of predaceous diving beetles in the family Dytiscidae. There is one described species in Petrodessus, P. conatus, found in Australasia.

References

Further reading

 
 
 

Dytiscidae